Acacia ampliata is a tree belonging to the genus Acacia and the subgenus Juliflorae. It is native to the Mid West region of Western Australia.

Ecology
It flowers from April to August or October to December producing yellow flowers. The plant will grown in sandy or loamy soils on plains and hillsides.

See also
List of Acacia species

References

ampliata
Acacias of Western Australia
Plants described in 1995
Taxa named by Bruce Maslin